Gold(I) bromide can be formed by synthesis from the elements or partial decomposition of gold(III) bromide by careful control of temperatures and pressures.

Structure 
It occurs in two modifications. One (I-AuBr) is isostructural with gold(I) chloride and has a body centered tetragonal unit cell with a = 6.734 Å, c = 8.674 Å, and space group I41/amd. The other (P-AuBr) is isostructural with gold(I) iodide and has a primitive tetragonal cell a = 4.296 Å, c = 12.146 Å, and space group P42/ncm. Single crystals of both modifications have been grown by chemical vapor transport. Small amounts of aluminum, gallium, or iron were used as catalysts for the transport process to obtain the I-AuBr modification.

The two structures both consist of -Br-Au-Br-Au-Br- polymeric zigzag chains, but they are stacked in a different arrangement. In the primitive tetragonal I-AuBr, the chains form layers (see figure) in contrast to the body centered P-AuBr, where they are more interwoven. Another difference is that the Au-Br-Au angle is only 77° in the former, but 92.3° in the latter.

Density functional calculations on the monohalides of group 11 (Cu, Ag, Au) have tried to shed light on the question why gold halides form rather different, low symmetry structures rather than the cubic zinc blend or rock salt structures of the silver and copper halides. It was shown that this calculation technique accurately predicts which structure type should be stable. The peculiar structures of the gold halides are mostly a result of the relativistic effects that occur for the elements of the later periods of the periodic table.

References

External links
Gold bromide on webelements

Bromides
Metal halides
Gold(I) compounds
Gold–halogen compounds